William Medcalf Kinsey (October 28, 1846 – June 20, 1931) was a U.S. Representative from Missouri.

Born in Mount Pleasant, Ohio, Kinsey attended Hopedale Academy, Harrison County, Ohio, and Monmouth College, Illinois. He became a resident of Muscatine County, Iowa, in 1863.

He studied law at the University of Iowa College of Law in Iowa City in 1871. He was admitted to the bar in 1872 and commenced practice in Muscatine County, Iowa, the same year. He moved to St. Louis, Missouri, in 1875 and engaged in the practice of law.

He married Lucy Loretta Chapin Kinsey.

Kinsey was elected as a Republican to the Fifty-first Congress (March 4, 1889 – March 3, 1891). He was an unsuccessful candidate for reelection in 1890 to the Fifty-second Congress.

He resumed the practice of law in St. Louis, Missouri. He served as judge of the circuit court of the city of St. Louis in 1904–1917.

During the First World War, he was chairman of the draft examining board in Carondelet.
He resumed the practice of his profession.

He died in St. Louis, Missouri, June 20, 1931. He was interred in Sunset Hill Burial Park, St. Louis County, Missouri.

References

1846 births
1931 deaths
People from Mount Pleasant, Ohio
Monmouth College alumni
University of Iowa College of Law alumni
Missouri state court judges
Republican Party members of the United States House of Representatives from Missouri